Adoxophyes balioleuca is a species of moth of the family Tortricidae. It is found in Micronesia.

References

Moths described in 1976
Adoxophyes
Moths of Oceania